Three ships in the United States Navy have been named USS Goldsborough for Louis M. Goldsborough.

 The first  was a torpedo boat, commissioned in 1908, served in World War I and decommissioned in 1919.
She was reclassified as AVP-18, AVD-5 and APD-32 throughout her career.
 The third  was  guided missile destroyer, commissioned in 1963 and decommissioned in 1993.

United States Navy ship names